Berit Aljand (born 8 July 1985) is an Estonian swimmer.

She was born in Tallinn. Her twin sister Triin and younger brother Martti are also swimmers. Her father Riho Aljand is a swimming coach, and her grandmother, Ulvi Voog (Indrikson) is a former Olympic swimmer. In 2010 she graduated from the University of Louisiana in international relations speciality.

She started her swimming exercising in 1992, coached by his father. She has competed at World Aquatics Championships. She is multiple-times Estonian champion in different swimming disciplines. 2000-2007 she was a member of Estonian national swimming team.

She is living and working in USA.

References

Living people
1985 births
Estonian female backstroke swimmers
Estonian emigrants to the United States
Swimmers from Tallinn